Janice Scroggins (July 17, 1955May 27, 2014) was a jazz pianist and instructor in Portland, Oregon.

Early life
Scroggins was born in 1955 in Idabel, Oklahoma, to Henry and Mary Scroggins.  Scroggins first began playing the piano at the age of three.  Her mother and grandmother, who were church pianists and organists, were among her first music instructors.   She attended high school and college in Oakland, California, and moved to the Albina community of Portland in 1978 along with her infant daughter, Arietta Ward.

Musical career
Scroggins performed with Portland area musicians including Linda Hornbuckle, Thara Memory, Curtis Salgado, Mel Brown and was featured regularly with New Orleans saxophonist Reggie Houston. She also played with the Norman Sylvester Blues Band and was a session musician for several other artists.

Scroggins was the music director for the Portland Interfaith Gospel Choir.  She directed the musical component of the World Arts Foundation's annual tribute to Martin Luther King Jr. for twenty-nine years.  Scroggins was also a piano teacher in the Portland Public School system and at Portland Community College.

In 1987, Scroggins published an album titled "Janice Scroggins Plays Scott Joplin."  The album was nominated for a Grammy Award in 1988.  She published her second major album, "Piano Love", in 2013. She also performed at the Portland Jazz Festival in March 2013.

Her music was influenced by gospel, or church music, as well as African rhythms and country. Oregon Arts Watch writer Bob Hicks described her music as having "a little bit of Oklahoma and a little bit of Oakland and a little bit of gospel and a whole river of American musical history in it".

Family 
Scroggins had three children; Arietta Ward, Nafisaria Scroggins, and Francis Scroggins.  At the time of her death, she had three grandchildren.

Death 
Scroggins died of a heart attack on May 27, 2014, shortly after playing piano for a Portland Community College class. She died at the Sylvania campus. Scroggins was fifty-eight years old at the time.

Tributes
In 1992, Scroggins was inducted into the Cascade Blues Association Hall of Fame. She was inducted into the Oregon Music Hall of Fame in 2013.

On August 9, 2014, Scroggins was honored with a free festival by Portland blues artists Norman Sylvester, the Linda Hornbuckle Band, the Strange Tones, and others.

Discography
 Janice Scroggins Plays Scott Joplin, Flying Heart Records (1987)
 Piano Love, MAH Records (2014)

External links
 Ms. Janice Scroggins and her 88 Keys
 Biography of Janice Scroggins

References

1955 births
2014 deaths
African-American pianists
American jazz pianists
American blues pianists
Gospel music pianists
Musicians from Portland, Oregon
People from Idabel, Oklahoma
20th-century American pianists
20th-century American women pianists
Jazz musicians from Oklahoma
Educators from Portland, Oregon
African-American history in Portland, Oregon
African-American educators
Women music educators
Portland Community College faculty
African-American history of Oregon
American women academics
African-American women musicians
20th-century African-American women
20th-century African-American people
20th-century African-American musicians
21st-century African-American people
21st-century African-American women